Homalin Airport is an airport at Homalin, in the Sagaing Region of Myanmar.

References

Airports in Myanmar